Absint may refer to:
 Absinthe, an alcoholic beverage
 AbsInt GmbH, a German software company